Scharl may refer to:

 Scharl, Netherlands, a village in the Netherlands
 S-charl, a village in Switzerland